PVS (or even, P.V.S or project São Lourenço da Mata). Is a project founded by DJ Mago on September 22, 2010, today the project contains at most another 15 courses with 200 students.

The headquarters of the PVS was founded on September 22 of 2010, in the district of São Lourenço da Mata by DJ Mago, which achieved great help. City Hall in 2010. All years. August, the party headquarters mayor made a homegem that is the story. Landmark of the city of São Lourenço da Mata. The owner headquarters spent over a million dollars to combat violence and take the children from the streets and the drug world for them are very importante this work. The seat has government help implement adequacy Not for the office in one sentence read his. Besides being a dj project wizard has one of the best west music studio, called Studio sinister metropolitan area west of the reef region. DJ Mago Responsible for Numerous compositions to his important work as a music producer even went on to receive awards and notoriety for a job Recognized by many.GERMAN, T.L. 2001. Potato virus S. In: STEVENSON, W.R. et al. (Ed.). Compendium of
potato diseases. 2.ed. St Paul,. 67p.
MANZER FE; MERRIAM, DC; HELPER, PR. 1978. Effects of Potato virus S and two
strains of Potato virus X on yield of Russet Burbank, Kennebec, and Katahdin cultivars
in Maine. American Potato Journal 55:601-609.
MÁRTON, L.; BUSO, JA.; DUSI, AN.; REIS, NVB. 1993. Degenerescência devido a
viroses em cultivares de batata. Horticultura Brasileira 11:82.
SILBERSCHMIDT, K. 1937. A degenerescência da batatinha. O Biológic. 9:247-251.
WETTER, C. 1971. Description of plant viruses: Potato virus S. Surrey, England:
Commonw. Mycol. Inst. /Assoc.Appl.Biol.,Kew. 60p.
WRIGHT, N.S. 1970. Combined effects Potato viruses X and S on yield of Netted Gem
and White Rose potatoes. American Potato Journal. 47:475-478.

Expression

The desire to help others can always overcome selfishness and lac of hope in man.
For needy children we have to take care.

Responsible for the Project

People

 MC Akilo PVS
 or even DJ MagoDJ Mago Incomparável DJ Mago O Terror das Produções PVS
 MC Saido Dparque
 Apesa PVS Rei do Pixe, da P.V.S
 Aseta SDC, PVS
 Avida PVS
 Amorte PVS
 MC Qualy PVS
 MC Marcio PVS
 MC Suati PVS
MC Asseta ODF- PVS
MC Straik PVS
 MC Alerta SDC
 MC Afonte PVS
MC Trapassa PVS
MC Pank PVS
 DJ Mago o incomparável PVS, DJ Mago PVS, DJ Mago o Terror das Produções, DJ Mago Studio Sinistro Zona Oeste
DJ Smik SDC

References 

Government of Brazil